Mufu, a secretariat, was a system for hiring able advisers, the muliao, by the imperial Chinese provincial officials. It dates back to 229 BC, but was extensively used in Qing dynasty. The system was also adopted in Japan by the shōgun. The Chinese characters (kanji) for mufu (幕府) are pronounced in Japanese as bakufu.

The term 
The first Chinese character mu (Chinese: 幕) denotes curtain, and tent, and the second character fu (Chinese: 府) denotes home and government, hence mufu means a tent government. The liao (Chinese: 僚) in muliao denotes bureaucrat, official.

The system 
The provincial officials were selected from the successful candidates of the literary imperial examination who had little to none practical skills to govern; and the Qing central government had no provision to provide them with technical staff since there wasn't training or recruiting of such experts. To perform their job well, the appointed scholars were forced to hire able men, muliao, to staff the mufu, to deal with flood, rebellion, finance and foreign affair. The mufu system was the well-oil machine that produced next generation high officials.

Mufu was staffed by private hires. It's headed by the official who was responsible of the salary. The official didn't have to report to the central government, unless he wanted to promote one of the members in his mufu for a regular position within the government bureaucracy.

Examples 
In Zeng Guofan's mufu, his muliao included Li Hongzhang In Li Hongzhang's mufu, his muliao included Pan Dingxin, Zhou Fu and Liu Bingzhang.

References

Government of Imperial China